Friesdorf is a quarter (Ortsteil) of city district (Stadtbezirk) Bad Godesberg, Bonn, Germany.

References

Urban districts and boroughs of Bonn